Katima Mulilo Airport , also known as Mpacha Airport, serves Katima Mulilo, the capital of the Zambezi Region in Namibia. The Katima Mulilo non-directional beacon (Ident: KL) is located on the field.

Airlines and destinations

See also
List of airports in Namibia
Transport in Namibia

References

External links

OurAirports - Katima
OpenStreetMap - Katima Mulilo

Airports in Namibia
Buildings and structures in Zambezi Region
Katima Mulilo